Hans Bøchmann Melchior (14 May 1773 – 11 September 1831) was a Danish Naturalist.

He was the author of Den danske Stats og Norges Pattedyr (The mammals of the Danish state and Norway), published posthumously in 1834.

References
Collin, Jonas (1897). "Melchior, Hans Bøchmann"  in C. F. Bricka (ed.) Dansk Biografisk Lexikon, tillige omfattende Norge for Tidsrummet 1537–1814 XI. bind. Copenhagen: Gyldendalske Boghandels Forlag, pp. 244–45.

1773 births
1831 deaths
Danish naturalists
Danish zoologists